Laurence Arthur Faunt (1554 – 28 February 1591) was an English Jesuit theologian and missionary to Poland.

Family background

Arthur Faunt was the third son of William Faunt of Foston, Leicestershire, by his second wife, Jane, daughter of George Vincent of Peckleton, and widow of Nicholas Purefoy of Fenny Drayton. The family was Roman Catholic.

Life

In 1568, Faunt was sent to Merton College, Oxford, and placed under the tuition of the philosopher John Pott, who had previously taught him in Leicestershire. Pott, also a Roman Catholic, removed Faunt from Oxford with the consent of his parents, and at the beginning of 1570 took him to Louvain and placed him in the Jesuit college at the Catholic University. 

After graduating B.A. at Louvain, Faunt lived for a time in Paris, and then proceeded to Munich. William V, Duke of Bavaria, chose him as his scholar, and maintained him in the university there, where he commenced M.A. In 1575 he went to the English College at Rome to study divinity.

The date at which he entered the Society of Jesus is uncertain: some authorities give 1570, others 1575, the year in which he went to Rome. It was, however, at this time that he took Laurence as his name in religion. He was appointed reader in theology at the English College in 1578; and was ordained in 1580. 

He attracted the attention of Pope Gregory XIII, who licensed Faunt to make a seal which would allow him to issue passports to his countrymen, enabling them to travel through foreign countries without fear of the Spanish Inquisition or any other similar danger. Pope Gregory died in 1585: it was supposed that had he lived longer, he would have raised Faunt to the rank of cardinal.

In 1581, King Stephen of Poland established a Jesuit college at Posen. Pope Gregory appointed Faunt to be its first rector, and he left Rome on 10 June 1581. Alegambe states that he was professor of Greek at Posen for three years, and of moral theology and controversy for nine years. 

He was highly esteemed by the spiritual and temporal estates of the Polish nation. A letter sent by him to his brother Anthony, dated at Danzig in 1589, shows that he was sent for at the same time by three different princes.

Death
Faunt died on 28 February 1591 at Vilnius, capital of the Grand Duchy of Lithuania (then part of the Polish–Lithuanian Commonwealth).

Works
His theological works included: 
 (Posen, 1580)
 ["Theological assertions of Christ's Church on earth, what are they and who may make them"] (Posen, 1584)
 (Posen: Joannem Wolrab, 1582)
 ["Book Three: In which Calvinists, Lutherans, and the rest, who call themselves Evangelicals, are, from arguments and miracles, most clearly proved to be outside the Christian Church, & simultaneously a defense of the same assertion against false accusations contained in the writing of Anthony Sadeel"] (Posen: Joannem Wolrab, 1584) (Posen, 1582) (Posen, 1583) (Posen, 1584) (Posen, 1584) (Posen, 1586) ([Cracow?], 1587); reprinted in 1632, and again in the Opuscula collected by Melchior Stephanidis (Cracow, 1632) (Cologne, 1589) (anon.) (1592) (Posen)''

References

Attribution

Further reading
 

1554 births
1591 deaths
16th-century English Jesuits
People from Blaby District
English religious writers
16th-century English writers
16th-century male writers
Alumni of Merton College, Oxford